Dialight plc is a British-based electronics business specialising in light-emitting diode lighting for hazardous locations. It is headquartered in London and operates in North America, the United Kingdom, mainland Europe, Australia, Asia and South America. It is listed on the London Stock Exchange and is a constituent of the FTSE SmallCap and FTSE techMARK Focus indices.

History

The business was founded in 1938 and became part of the Dutch company Philips in 1963. In 1990, through a management buyout, it became part of Roxboro Group, which was first listed on the London Stock Exchange in 1993. In 2005, it was renamed Dialight.

Operations
The company has three divisions:
 Signals and Illumination (traffic and rail signals as well as obstruction lights)
 Solid state lights (low-energy lighting technology)
Optoelectronics

References

External links
 Official site

British companies established in 1938
Electronics companies of the United Kingdom